The Sun Belt Conference sponsors nine men's sports and 10 women's sports. This is a list of conference champions for each sport.

Members
All dates of membership reflect the calendar years of entry and departure. Since all past Sun Belt associate members participated only in fall sports, the year of departure is the calendar year after the final (planned) season of competition.

Full members
Appalachian State
Arkansas State
Coastal Carolina
Georgia Southern
Georgia State
James Madison
Louisiana
Louisiana–Monroe
Marshall
Old Dominion
South Alabama
Southern Miss
Texas State
Troy

Affiliate members
 Charleston – beach volleyball
 Kentucky – men's soccer
 Mercer – beach volleyball
 South Carolina – men's soccer
 Stephen F. Austin – beach volleyball
 UNCW – beach volleyball
 West Virginia – men's soccer

Future affiliate members
 UCF – men's soccer, 2023–future

Former full members
UAB, 1976–1991
Central Florida, 1991–1992
Denver, 1999–2012
FIU, 1998–2013
Florida Atlantic, 2005–2013
Jacksonville, 1978–1998
Lamar, 1991–1998
Little Rock, 1991–2022
Louisiana Tech, 1991–2001
Middle Tennessee, 2000–2013
New Mexico State, 2000–2005
UNO, 1976–1980; 1991–2010
UNC-Charlotte, 1976–1991
North Texas, 2000–2013
South Florida, 1976–1991
UT Arlington, 2013–2022
UT Pan American, 1991–1998
VCU, 1979–1991
Western Kentucky, 1982–2014

Former affiliate members
 Central Arkansas – men's soccer, 2019–2021
 Hartwick – men's soccer, 2014–2018
 Howard – men's soccer, 2014–2021
 Idaho – football, 2001–2005, 2014–2018
 New Mexico State – football, 2014–2018
 NJIT – men's soccer, 2014–2016
 Utah State – football, 2003–2005

Vic Bubas Cup
The Vic Bubas Cup (formerly the Sun Belt Cup) is the Sun Belt's all-sports championship trophy, named after the Sun Belt's first commissioner Vic Bubas. South Alabama has won the most Bubas Cups with 15.

Scoring 

 For sports with regular season conference competition (baseball, basketball, football, soccer, softball, and volleyball), cup points are awarded based on each teams' regular season finish (determined by winning percentage in conference games for all sports besides soccer. In soccer, standings are determined by points, with three points given for a win, one point for a draw, and no points for a loss).
For sports without regular season competition (cross country, golf, track and field, and tennis), points are awarded based on Sun Belt Tournament finish.
 The number of points for each sport is based on the number of schools in the conference which sponsor that sport. For example, the men's basketball regular season champion receives 12 points but the men's cross country champion only receives 9.
 For sports with both a regular season conference competition and a conference tournament, the conference tournament winner receives one additional point.
 For sports with divisions (baseball, basketball, football, and volleyball), points are awarded based on overall conference record regardless of divisional finish.

History 
The early years of the competition were largely dominated by the South Florida Bulls, who won 8 of the first 10 Vic Bubas Cups. After USF left the conference following their 9th Cup win after the 1990 season, South Alabama took over as the dominant force in the conference, winning 8 of the next 10 competitions. Between 2001 and 2014, the only teams to win the Cup were Middle Tennessee (with 9) and Western Kentucky (with 5). Middle Tennessee left the conference after 2013 and Western Kentucky did the same the following year, which paved the way for South Alabama to retake control of the Cup for each of the next 4 seasons.

Winners 

*– No longer members of the Sun Belt Conference.

Current champions

Baseball

The Sun Belt Conference has sponsored an annual baseball tournament to determine the conference winner and automatic NCAA Division I Tournament host since 1978. South Alabama has won the most championships, at 13. The Sun Belt also has imposed several seasons under divisional structure (1981-1994; 2016-2021). In 2022, the structure reverted back to standard structure (1978-1980; 1995-2015; 2022-present).

Softball

The Sun Belt Conference has sponsored an annual softball tournament to determine the conference winner and automatic bid to the NCAA Division I softball tournament since 2000. Louisiana has won the most championships, at 17.

Basketball

Since 2020–21, the Sun Belt Conference men's and women's basketball tournaments, held in early March, has involved all conference members and is played entirely in Pensacola, Florida. First- and second-round games are played at Hartsell Arena on the campus of Pensacola State College and the Pensacola Bay Center, with semifinals and finals at the Bay Center. Winners of the tournaments earn automatic bids to their respective NCAA Division I Basketball Tournament.

Football
Of the current 12 full Sun Belt members, 10 play football in the conference. Idaho and New Mexico State competed as single-sport members before being dropped from Sun Belt football after the 2017 season. Little Rock and UTA do not sponsor football. All four future Sun Belt members sponsor football.

Champions

Golf

Champions

References

Sun Belt Conference
Sun Belt Conference